A list of films that are based on western fiction.

Geographically, this page encompasses the frontiers of the United States, Canada, and Mexico, as well as Australia and South America.At present, South Africa and Siberia are not included.

First Story based movie is Cindrella in 1899 which is based on Charles Perrault folk Story Cindrella. Written in 1697 and Second is Frankestien on 1910 based on Shakespeare Rpmio Juliet.

17th and 18th centuries

Missionaries

Settlers

19th century
(and the Edwardian age)

Unclassified

 * television film.

Frequently filmed: Riders of the Purple Sage

Bushrangers

Cavalrymen

Cowboys

Entertainers and mythmakers

Explorers

 † Dramatized documentary.

Forty-niners and goldseekers

California Gold Rush
1848–1855

Gauchos, charros y vaqueros

Frequently filmed: Martín Fierro

Gunfighters

Hunters

Indians

 * television film.

Frequently filmed: "A Man Called Horse"

Lawmen

Frequently filmed: Destry Rides Again

Lumberjacks

Missionaries

Mountain men

Mounties

Twice filmed: Tiger Rose

Outlaws

Railroaders and railwaymen
(The USA has railroads. Canada has railways, as did the rest of the British Empire.)

 * TV miniseries.

Schoolmarms

Frequently filmed: The Rainmaker

 ♠ A spinster smart enough to be a schoolmarm falls for a con man.

Sertanejos, cangaceiros e jagunços

Settlers and sodbusters

Outback
("The Never-Never", "the back of beyond", "the back of Bourke")

Sourdoughs and cheechakos

Stage drivers

Teamsters and muleskinners

Telegraphers

Temperance crusaders and teetotallers

Vigilantes

Whalers

20th century

Explorers

Indians

 * television film.

Individualists

Missionaries

Prospectors

References

Notes

See also
Pages with the same format
 List of films based on arts books
 List of films based on civics books
 List of films based on crime books
 List of films based on film books
 List of films based on sports books
 List of films based on spy books
 List of films based on war books

   Return to top of page.

Western fiction
 Western fiction